Molly & the Heymakers was an American country music group formed in 1987. The band consisted of Martha "Molly" Scheer (lead vocals, fiddle, mandolin, rhythm guitar), Andy Dee (lead guitar), Jeff Nelson (bass guitar), Joe Lindzius (drums) and Chad "C.J." Udeen (steel guitar). Their highest charting single, "Chasin' Something Called Love," peaked at No. 50 on the Billboard Hot Country Singles & Tracks chart in 1991; it was included on their self-titled debut album, issued in 1992 on Reprise Records.

Transition to new sound
In 1998, Molly Scheer and Andy Dee, along with Rick Berger (bass guitar) and Scott Tate (drums), released an album of harder-edged material under the moniker known as "Molly & The Makers." The music on this album featured a mixture of styles including Alt.country, Cowpunk, Country, folk rock, Rock and Roll, Alternative rock, rock, power pop, punk rock, garage punk, indie rock and indie pop.

Discography

Albums

Singles

Music videos

References

External links
Molly and the Danger Band Official site
[ allmusic ((( Molly & the Heymakers > Overview )))]

American country music groups
Reprise Records artists
Musical groups from Wisconsin
Musical groups established in 1987